Martinfjella is a mountain range in Wedel Jarlsberg Land at Spitsbergen, Svalbard. The range has an extension of about ten kilometers, and is located between the glaciers Antoniabreen and Recherchebreen. Among the mountains are Maria Theresiatoppen, Jarnfjellet, Magnethøgda, Durochertoppen, Bienaimétoppane and Gavltoppane.

References

Mountain ranges of Spitsbergen